This is a list of video games based on the Transformers television series and movies, or featuring any of the characters.

Transformers games have been released for the Sinclair Spectrum, Commodore 64, Family Computer, Family Computer Disk System, Microsoft Windows, Mac OS, PlayStation, Game Boy Color, Nintendo 64, PlayStation 2, Mobile, iOS, Android, webOS, BlackBerry OS, and Virtual Console.  Hasbro sold the digital gaming rights various properties, including My Little Pony, Magic: The Gathering, Tonka, Playskool, and The Transformers, to Infogrames for $100 million USD in 2000, and then it bought back the rights for $65 million USD in June 2005.

Titles

Based on The Transformers

Based on Beast Wars: Transformers

Games based on the film series

Games based on Transformers: Animated

Games based on Transformers: Prime

War for Cybertron series

Other games

References

Video games
 
Video game franchises
Lists of video games by franchise
Video games about mecha
Video games set in the future